TV Senado (Portuguese for Senate TV) is a Brazilian television network responsible for broadcasting activity from the Brazilian Senate. It was created in 1996 by the Brazilian Senate. The channel broadcasts 24h from the Senate.

TV Senado broadcasts on YouTube, on its own channel started in December 2010. During the impeachment of Dilma Rousseff and her subsequent removal from office in late 2016, the channel surpassed 100 thousand subscribers, for which they later received the Silver Play Button. The channel surpassed 500 thousand subscribers in March 2020.

Public interest for TV Senado went up again after the start of the COVID-19 CPI, an investigation on omissions and irregularities in federal government spending during the COVID-19 pandemic in Brazil. As of May 2021, the channel has over 760 thousand subscribers.

References

External links
Official website of the Brazilian Senate

TV Senado
TV Senado
Portuguese-language television stations in Brazil
Television channels and stations established in 1996